Kiyan Nassiri Giri (born 17 November 2000) is an Indian professional footballer who plays as an attacking midfielder or winger for ATK Mohun Bagan in the Indian Super League.

Personal life
Kiyan is the son of former Iran national youth team player and East Bengal legend Jamshid Nassiri. Grew up in Queens Mansion on Park Street, Kiyan's mother Susanne is born and brought up in Kolkata, while his elder brother Jaswa is a swimmer. He was also a student of St. Xavier's Collegiate School.

Club career

Earlier career
Kiyan is the son of East Bengal legend Jamshid Nassiri. He was always passionate about football and during his school days he was called up for the Bengal U14 camp in Kalyani in 2014. During the U14 camp in Kalyani, in which he made 5 appearances and scored 6 goals. He went on to play for the Mohammedan Sporting U16 I-league squad. During the 2017–18 season, he joined Calcutta Football Club, and was the highest scorer in the league helping the team to promotion that season.

In 2019, he joined Mohun Bagan to play for their U-19 side in the Zee Bangla Football League and was sent on trial for the senior team.

Mohun Bagan
Kibu Vicuna was impressed by his performance at 2019–20 pre-season trial in Goa and promoted him to the senior team. He made his debut at the senior level on 1 March 2020, by coming as a substitute against TRAU FC in the I-League.

ATK Mohun Bagan
Following the merger of ATK and Mohun Bagan in 2020 to become ATK Mohun Bagan, he signed a long term contract with the club and was included in senior squad for the 2021–22 Indian Super League season. Ahead of the team's inter-zonal semifinal match against Uzbek side FC Nasaf in the 2021 AFC Cup, Kiyan was called up in twenty-two member squad. He debuted for the side against Nasaf.

He scored a hat-trick for ATK Mohun Bagan in their 3–1 derby win against East Bengal on 29 January 2022, and became the youngest ever player in the Indian Super League to do so. As 2022–23 season began, Nassiri appeared with the club on 20 August against Rajasthan United at the 131st edition of Durand Cup, in which he scored the opener but lost the match by 3–2.

Career statistics

Club

Honours
Mohun Bagan
I-League: 2019–20
Individual
Mohun Bagan Best Forward Award: 2022
ATK Mohun Bagan
ISL: 2022-23

References

External links

Kiyan Nassiri at the-aiff.com (AIFF)

Kiyan Nassiri at PlaymakerStats

Living people
2000 births
Footballers from Kolkata
Indian footballers
Association football midfielders
Mohun Bagan AC players
I-League players
Indian people of Iranian descent
Sportspeople of Iranian descent
Sportspeople from Kolkata